Ribeira Dom João is a settlement in the southeast of the island of Maio in Cape Verde. It lies near the coast, 4 km east of Barreiro and 10 km east of Porto Inglês.  As of the 2010 census, its population was 203.

See also
List of villages and settlements in Cape Verde

References
 

Villages and settlements in Maio, Cape Verde